The Ocean Tracking Network is a research effort using implanted acoustic transmitters to study fish migration patterns.  It is based at Dalhousie University in Nova Scotia.  The technology used by the Ocean Tracking Network comes from the Pacific Ocean Shelf Tracking Project (POST) and the Tagging of Pacific Pelagics (TOPP) project.

References

External links

Fisheries databases

Acoustics
Sound